Sethu Sriram is a national award-winning cinematographer, art director and director. He is best known for his national award-winning short film Blindfolded (2000). He has worked in Malayalam, Tamil, Kannada, Telugu and Hindi films. In 2014, he is coming with his first Hindi film SNAFU.

Personal life
Sethu Sriram was born to a Tamil family in Chennai. His father V. Sethuraman and mother S. Nagalaxmi are both professors. Sethu Sriram holds three degrees, B.S.C in Physics, Diploma in Film Technology and Post Graduation in Mass Communication and Journalism.Sethu sriram's wife,  Cauvery Sriram is a house wife.Sethu Sriram's son, Kailash Sriram is studying Visual Communication in Loyola Chennai.

Career
Sethu was a long time associate of Santosh Sivan started his career as director of photography, he has shot the films Hindi Shakti (2002), Tere Naam (2003), Wanted (2008), Milenge Milenge (2010) and OMG – Oh My God! (2012). In the Tamil industry he has done films like Saamurai (2002), Aiyyanaar (2010), and in Telugu cinema he has been a part of films like Shri Anjaneyam (2004) and Annavaram (2006). His stint in Malayalam films include names such as Thanmathra (2005) and Metro (2011). Sriram's made his directorial debut with the Kannada film Godfather (2012).

Filmography
As director

As director of photography
2019       Ghe Double
 
2020       Dil Hai Gray
2021     jagan Char Yaar
2022    Vanjam Teerthayada
2022.   Super Woman

Art director

Awards and nominations

References

External links
 

21st-century Indian film directors
Living people
Film directors from Chennai
Tamil film cinematographers
Cinematographers from Tamil Nadu
Year of birth missing (living people)